The Charles Wenner House is an historic house located near Galena, Illinois, in the United States. It was listed on the National Register of Historic Places in 1984.  The house is significant for its connection to European settlers who arrived in the area in the mid-19th century to work the lead mines near Galena.

The Wenner house had been vacant for thirty years by 1984, it had been used as a corn crib in 1954.

See also
 National Register of Historic Places listings in Jo Daviess County, Illinois

References

1854 establishments in Illinois
Demolished buildings and structures in Illinois
Galena, Illinois
Houses completed in 1854
Houses in Jo Daviess County, Illinois
Houses on the National Register of Historic Places in Illinois
National Register of Historic Places in Jo Daviess County, Illinois